Antoni Maszewski (5 May 1908 – 5 August 1944) was a Polish sprinter. He competed in the men's 4 × 400 metres relay at the 1936 Summer Olympics. He was killed in action during World War II.

References

1908 births
1944 deaths
Athletes (track and field) at the 1936 Summer Olympics
Polish male sprinters
Olympic athletes of Poland
Place of birth missing
Polish military personnel killed in World War II